Englewood Golf Club was a private golf course in the eastern United States, located in Englewood and Leonia, New Jersey, just west of New York City. Opened  as a nine-hole course in 1896, a second nine was added four years later; it hosted the U.S. Amateur in 1906 and the U.S. Open in 1909.

The golf course met its demise in the 1960s when the approach ramp to the George Washington Bridge cut right through the middle of the property. This portion of the New Jersey Turnpike was built on the border between Englewood and Leonia, and bisected the golf course; the clubhouse was in the northeast corner of the property. Play continued on the divided course, but the financial burden became too great, and the course closed in 1976. Cross Creek Point condominiums were built on the northeast half in Englewood, and single-family houses were built on the southwest half in Leonia, with a street named Golf Course Drive.

Additional information can be found by reading: "The Missing Links: America's Greatest Lost Golf Courses & Holes" by Daniel Wexler.

In 1926, the club hosted the wedding reception of New York Post editor Joseph Cookman and his bride Mary Bass, editor of the Ladies Home Journal.

References

1896 establishments in New Jersey
1976 disestablishments in New Jersey
Defunct golf clubs and courses
Englewood, New Jersey
Golf clubs and courses in New Jersey
Leonia, New Jersey
Sports venues in Bergen County, New Jersey